The 1997 Indian vice-presidential election was held on 16 August 1997 to elect Vice-President of India. Krishan Kant defeated Surjit Singh Barnala to become 10th Vice-President of India. At the time of the election, VP office was vacant since the incumbent, K. R. Narayanan, had already inaugurated as President following his victory in the presidential election.

Candidates

Results

|- align=center
!style="background-color:#E9E9E9" class="unsortable"|
!style="background-color:#E9E9E9" align=center|Candidate
!style="background-color:#E9E9E9" |Party
!style="background-color:#E9E9E9" |Electoral Votes
!style="background-color:#E9E9E9" |% of Votes
|-
| 
|align="left"|Krishan Kant||align="left"|Janata Dal||441||61.76
|-
| 
|align="left"|Surjit Singh Barnala||align="left"|SAD||273||38.24
|-
| colspan="5" style="background:#e9e9e9;"|
|-
! colspan="3" style="text-align:left;"| Total
! style="text-align:right;"|714
! style="text-align:right;"|100.00
|-
| colspan="5" style="background:#e9e9e9;"| 
|-
|-
|colspan="3" style="text-align:left;"|Valid Votes||714||93.95
|-
|colspan="3" style="text-align:left;"|Invalid Votes||46||6.05
|-
|colspan="3" style="text-align:left;"|Turnout||760||96.20
|-
|colspan="3" style="text-align:left;"|Abstentions||30||3.80
|-
|colspan="3" style="text-align:left;"|Electors||790|| style="background:#e9e9e9;"|
|-
|}

See also
 1997 Indian presidential election

References

External links

Vice-presidential elections in India
India